Opossum Creek (also known as Possum Branch) is a stream in Bourbon and Linn counties, in the U.S. state of Kansas. It is a tributary of the Little Osage River.

Opossum Creek was named for the great number of opossums trapped there by first settlers.

See also
List of rivers of Kansas

References

Rivers of Bourbon County, Kansas
Rivers of Linn County, Kansas
Rivers of Kansas